Madison District Public Schools is a school district serving the south end of Madison Heights, Michigan in Greater Detroit.

Madison District Public Schools is located in Oakland County in southeastern Michigan and currently serves 1350 students pre-K through grade 12.  The district operates one early childhood center, one elementary school, one middle school, a high school and an alternative high school.

Demographics
As of 2020, nearly 20% of Madison District students spoke English as a second language.

Schools
Madison High School
Madison Preparatory High School
Wilkinson Middle School
Madison Elementary School
Schoenhals Elementary School (closed)
Edison Elementary School (closed)
Halfman Elementary School (closed)

Transportation
Due to its small geographic size, Madison District does provide busing for general education students when they travel to and from school. Madison District also provides busing for athletic trips, field trips, and special education transportation. The district contracts its busing services to Clawson Public Schools. The Madison District did so in order to save money. Paul Rogers, the superintendent of the Madison District, stated in 2008 that there were annual savings of $165,000 for contracting with Clawson. Before Madison District contracted to Clawson, it had a staff of five full-time bus drivers.

References

External links

 Madison District Public Schools

School districts in Michigan
Madison Heights, Michigan
Education in Oakland County, Michigan